The Treaty of Canandaigua (or Konondaigua, as spelled in the treaty itself) also known as the Pickering Treaty and the Calico Treaty, is a treaty signed after the American Revolutionary War between the Grand Council of the Six Nations and President George Washington representing the United States of America.

It was signed at Canandaigua, New York on November 11, 1794, by fifty sachems and war chiefs representing the Grand Council of the Six Nations of the Iroquois (Haudenosaunee) Confederacy (including the Cayuga, Mohawk, Oneida, Onondaga, Seneca and Tuscarora tribes), and by Timothy Pickering, official agent of President George Washington.

Background of the treaty

The Treaty of Canandaigua arose out of a combination of geo-political tensions. In the aftermath of its defeat in the American Revolutionary War, Great Britain was forced to relinquish its land east of the Mississippi River to the United States. However, Great Britain’s original rights to this territory were unclear, causing resentment among the Haudenosaunee Confederacy, to whom the land originally belonged. Moreover, some indigenous peoples on the western frontier of the United States remained loyal to the British after the American Revolutionary War and were hostile towards the United States. The United States faced resentment from the Haudenosaunee Confederacy over their acceptance of land in the Ohio Valley from Great Britain and faced the threat of another war on its western frontier.

In order to avoid war, the United States government sought to define a solid boundary on its western frontier. It also recognized that peace with the Haudenosaunee Confederacy was critical at this point in case another war did break out.

The United States attempted to make peace with the Haudenosaunee Confederacy with a series of conferences and treaties: the treaties of Fort Stanwix and Fort Harmar. However, both treaties were considered failures by the United States government because they resulted in increased tension with the Haudenosaunee Confederacy.

United States Secretary of War Henry Knox began a military operation on the western frontier in September 1790 and appointed Indian commissioner Timothy Pickering to address the Haudenosaunee Confederacy’s grievances with the United States government. Pickering decided to follow a “strategy of conciliation and compromise”, beginning with a conference with the Seneca Nation to offer gifts and peace after the failed treaties of Fort Harmar and Fort Stanwix. A series of conferences followed, in which Pickering opened dialogue between the Haudenosaunee Confederacy and the United States regarding what was to become of the land that Great Britain had lost. In October 1791. Knox’s military efforts of the western frontier were failing, and he suggested enlisting the Haudenosaunee Confederacy to fight on behalf of the United States. The Haudenosaunee Confederacy, along with Pickering, were unimpressed by Knox’s request, and declined to participate in the war. In 1793, the military operation on the western frontier broke out into war, escalating the situation in the Ohio Valley.

In June of 1794, the Haudenosaunee Confederacy proposed a conference at Buffalo Creek, in which the Haudenosaunee Confederacy rejected the Fort Harmar and Fort Stanwix treaties, resulting in the United States ceding land to the Seneca Nation. Afraid that the Haudenosaunee Confederacy would join the opposition at the western frontier, the United States held the first conference for the Treaty of Canandaigua in September 1794.

The official conference for the Treaty of Canandaigua began on October 18, 1794, with more than 1,500 members of the Haudenosaunee Confederacy present. Deliberations were tense at first because of discrepancies of culture beliefs on treaties. According to scholar Granville Ganter, “unlike their Anglo counterparts, the Haudenosaunee saw treaty agreements as requiring constant renewal and upkeep. The term they used was ‘brightening the chain of friendship’”. Seneca leader Red Jacket played an integral role in helping Pickering overcome some of these ideological differences throughout the deliberations. He “reminded Pickering that making peace requires declarations that mean one thing – peace – and mixing in language of blame or criticism simply fouls the process”.

Another ideological difference between the United States and the Haudenosaunee Confederacy during deliberations was the role of women. No United States settler women were included in the dialogue; however, Haudenosaunee women, in keeping with their significant role in tribal governance, were included. Historian Joan M. Jensen states that Seneca women “spoke during the negotiations of the Treaty of 1794 with the United States government”.

The conference ended on November 11, 1794, when fifty-nine war chiefs and sachems signed the treaty, and the text of the Canandaigua treaty, which comprised seven articles, was submitted to the U.S. Senate on January 2, 1795, carrying the title: "The Six Nations, and Oneida, Tuscarora, and Stockbridge Tribes'”.

Terms of the treaty 

The treaty established peace and friendship between the United States of America and the Six Nations, and affirmed Haudenosaunee land rights in the state of New York, and the boundaries established by the Phelps and Gorham Purchase of 1788.

Article One of the treaty promises “perpetual peace and friendship” between America and the Haudenosaunee Confederacy. Article Two acknowledges lands belonging to the Oneida, Onondoga, and Cayuga, and gives them the legal right to sell the land if they so wish and Article Three legally defines the perimeter of Seneca territories. Article Four maintains that America must not “claim or disturb” any lands belonging to the Haudenosaunee Confederacy. Article Five legally acknowledges that the road from “Fort Schlosser to Lake Erie, as far south as Buffalo Creek” belongs to the Seneca Nation. Article Six promises $4500 each year to the Haudenosaunee Confederacy from America. Article Seven states that if the “perpetual peace and friendship” between the Haudenosaunee Confederacy and America were to be disturbed in any way, that the conflict would be resolved peacefully by a third party.

Legacy

Current status
Article 6 continues to be honored by the contracting parties. Article 6 of the treaty provides that the U.S. government annually provide goods valued at $4,500. To date, Haudenosaunee leaders have insisted that the payment be made with bolts of cloth, rather than cash, as a means of adhering to the terms of the largely dishonored treaty.

Article 2, which ensured the land rights of the Oneida, Onondaga, and Cayuga nations would be protected by the U.S. government against state interference, was dishonored by the U.S. government. By the early 19th century, federal Indian agents were "deeply involved" in furthering a federal policy of depriving the Oneida people of their Article 2 rights to the quiet enjoyment of their treaty lands by both failing to prevent the state of New York from purchasing the treaty lands and actively "encouraging the removal of the Oneidas... to the west." By 1920, the Oneida Nation retained only  of treaty land down from the  held before the American Revolution.

The Oneida Nation of Wisconsin were still receiving an annuity check of $1,800, as late as 1941, almost 150 years after the treaty took effect.

Quakers
The Quakers were involved in the aftermath of the treaty. Pickering appointed the Quakers to teach the Haudenosaunee Confederacy “European-style agriculture”. The Friends’ Review, a Quaker publication, recalls “ploughs, axes, and hoes” being “liberally” supplied to the Haudenosaunee Confederacy. The treaty has had a lasting legacy in asserting the sovereignty of the Haudenosaunee Confederacy; historian Robert W. Venables states that “from 1794 to the present day, the treaty has been the legal keystones of relations between the United States and the Six Nations of the Iroquois Confederacy. The treaty is at the center of any of the Six Nation’s land claims and their rights to govern their own reservations”. The sovereignty and autonomy established in the treaty was also reaffirmed in the State Papers of the London Review of 1796, stating that anyone is able to “freely to pass and repass” through the territory addressed in the treaty, while recognizing the friendship established by the treaty itself.

Signatories
The treaty was signed by fifty Sachems and War Chiefs.

Notable signatories include:
 Ki-ant-whau-ka (Corn Planter)
 Kon-ne-at-or-tee-ooh (Handsome Lake)
 Se-quid-ong-guee (Little Beard)
 Sog-goo-ya-waut-hau (Red Jacket)
 Honayawus (Farmer's Brother) (see: Battle of Devil's Hole)
 Timothy Pickering

See also
 Treaty of Big Tree
 Treaties of Buffalo Creek
 List of treaties

References

Sources
 Laurence M. Hauptman, Conspiracy of Interests: Iroquois Dispossession and the Rise of New York State (2001).
 Jemison, G. Peter (ed.), Schein, Anna M. (ed.) and Powless Jr., Irving (ed.). Treaty of Canandaigua 1794: 200 Years of Treaty Relations Between the Iroquois Confederacy and the United States. Clear Light Publishing, 2000.

External links
 Canandaigua Treaty Text
 1794 Canandaigua Treaty Commemoration Committee
 Yearly Commemoration of the Canandaigua Treaty
 The Canandaigua Treaty of 1794: Events Leading up to the Treaty by Robert G. Koch
 The Great Treaty of Canandaigua, painting by Robert Griffing

1794 treaties
Iroquois
United States and Native American treaties
History of New York (state)
Aboriginal title in New York
Canandaigua, New York